Stéphane Poulat (born 8 December 1971) is an athlete from France.  He competes in triathlon.

Poulat competed at the second Olympic triathlon at the 2004 Summer Olympics.  He placed fourteenth with a total time of 1:53:51.35.

References

French male triathletes
Triathletes at the 2004 Summer Olympics
1971 births
Living people
Olympic triathletes of France
20th-century French people
21st-century French people